Cambodian Women’s Association was a Cambodian women's rights organization, founded in 1949. It was the first women's organization in Cambodia, and are considered the starting point of the women's movement in Cambodia. It was founded by a group of educated upper class women in Phnom Penh.

References

 Area Handbook for Cambodia

Organizations established in 1949
1949 establishments
Women's rights organizations
Women's organizations based in Cambodia
1940s in Cambodia
Women's rights in Cambodia
Voter rights and suffrage organizations